Petar Nikezić (3 April 1950 – 19 July 2014) was a Yugoslav and Serbian footballer who played as a forward. He is best remembered for his powerful shots and set pieces.

Club career
During his two spells with Vojvodina (1967–78 and 1979–80), Nikezić made a total of 289 appearances and scored 100 goals in the Yugoslav First League. He also briefly played for the Tulsa Roughnecks of the North American Soccer League, before joining Austrian club VÖEST Linz in 1978.

International career
At international level, Nikezić was capped three times for Yugoslavia between 1971 and 1973.

Honours
Vojvodina
 Mitropa Cup: 1976–77

References

External links
 
 
 

Association football forwards
Austrian Football Bundesliga players
Expatriate footballers in Austria
Expatriate soccer players in the United States
FC Linz players
FK Vojvodina players
HNK Šibenik players
NK Osijek players
North American Soccer League (1968–1984) players
Serbian footballers
Tulsa Roughnecks (1978–1984) players
Yugoslav expatriate footballers
Yugoslav expatriates in Austria
Yugoslav expatriate sportspeople in the United States
Yugoslav First League players
Yugoslav footballers
Yugoslavia international footballers
1950 births
2014 deaths